China has 34 major ports and more than 2000 minor ports. The former are mostly sea ports (except for ports such as Shanghai, Nanjing and Jiujiang along the Yangtze and Guangzhou in the Pearl river delta) opening up to the Yellow sea (Bo Hai), Taiwan straits, Pearl river and South China Sea while the latter comprise ports that lie along the major and minor rivers of China. Most of China's major cities are also ports or are facilitated by a port nearby.

Major ports
The major ports in China, listed North to South, consist of:

1. Dalian 
2. Yingkou 
3. Jinzhou 
4. Qinhuangdao 
5. Tianjin 
6. Yantai 
7. Weihai 
8. Qingdao 
9. Rizhao 
10. Lianyungang 
11. Nantong 
12. Zhenjiang 
13. Jiangyin 
14. Nanjing 
15. Shanghai 
16. Ningbo 
17. Zhoushan 
18. Jiujiang
19. Taizhou (North of Wenzhou)
20. Wenzhou 
21. Taizhou (South of Wenzhou)
22. Changle 
23. Quanzhou 
24. Xiamen 
25. Shantou 
26. Jieyang
27. Guangzhou 
28. Zhuhai 
29. Shenzhen 
30. Zhanjiang 
31. Beihai 
32. Fangchenggang 
33. Haikou 
34. Basuo

Port construction and cargoes
China's coastal ports enable the transportation of coal, containers, imported iron ore, and grain; roll-on-roll-off operations between mainland and islands; and deep-water access to the sea.

In port construction, China has especially strengthened the container transport system, concentrating on the construction of a group of deep-water container wharves at Dalian, Tianjin, Qingdao, Shanghai, Ningbo, Xiamen and Shenzhen, and thus laying the foundations for China's container hubs. A new deep-water port has opened in Yangshan southeast of Shanghai.

The coal transportation system has been further strengthened with the construction of a number of coal transport wharves. In addition, wharves handling crude oil and iron ore imports have been reconstructed or expanded.

At the end of 2004, China's coastal ports had over 2,500 berths of medium size or above, of which 650 were 10,000-ton-class berths; their handling capacity was 61.5 million standard containers for the year, ranking first in the world. Freight volumes handled by some large ports exceed 100 million tons a year; and the Shanghai, Shenzhen, Qingdao, Tianjin, Guangzhou, Xiamen, Ningbo and Dalian have been listed among the world's top 50 container ports..

130 of China's 2,000 ports are open to foreign ships. The major ports, including river ports accessible by ocean-going ships, are Beihai, Dalian, Dandong, Fuzhou, Guangzhou, Haikou, Hankou, Huangpu, Jiujiang, Lianyungang, Nanjing, Nantong, Ningbo, Qingdao, Qinhuangdao, Rizhao, Sanya, Shanghai, Shantou, Shenzhen, Tianjin, Weihai, Wenzhou, Xiamen, Yangzhou, Yantai, and Zhanjiang.

By province

Jiangxi
Port of Jiujiang

Fujian
Port of Fuzhou
Port of Quanzhou
Port of Xiamen

Guangdong
Port of Guangzhou
Port of Shenzhen
Port of Shantou
Port of Zhanjiang
Shunde Port
Rongqi Port
Gaolan Port

Hainan
Haikou New Port
Haikou Port New Seaport
Haikou Xiuying Port
Macun Port
Port of Yangpu
South Port

Hebei
Caofeidian
Qinhuangdao Port

Hong Kong
Container Terminal 9
Crooked Harbour
Double Haven
Gin Drinkers Bay
Hongkong International Terminals Ltd.
Hebe Haven
Holt's Wharf
Inner Port Shelter
Kwai Tsing Container Terminals
Long Harbour (Hong Kong)
Modern Terminals Limited
Mun Tsai Tong
Port of Hong Kong
River Trade Terminal
Rocky Harbour (Hong Kong)
Port Shelter
Starling Inlet
Tai Tam Harbour
Three Fathoms Cove
Tolo Harbour
Tsing Yi Tong
Victoria Harbour
Victoria Harbour

Jiangsu
Port of Suzhou
Changshu Xinghua Port

Liaoning
Port of Dalian
Port of Jinzhou
Port of Yingkou

Macau
Kai Ho Port
Macau Container Port

Shandong
Port of Weihai
Port of Yantai
Qingdao Port
Qingdao Qianwan Container Terminal

Shanghai
Port of Shanghai
Yangshan Port

Tianjin
Port of Tianjin

Zhejiang
Port of Ningbo-Zhoushan

See also
 List of East Asian ports
 Container industry in China

References

 China Factfile > Transport, Post and Telecommunications :Ports
 List of ports in China Sorted by province.
 Marine News China Information/News on Chinese Ports.

China
 
China transport-related lists